This article presents lists of the literary events and publications in 1815.

Events

January 2 – Lord Byron marries Anna Isabella Milbanke at Seaham, County Durham.
April 7 – Lord Byron and Walter Scott meet for the first time, in the offices of publisher John Murray, 50 Albemarle Street in London.
May – First publication of the North American Review.
June 15 – The Duchess of Richmond's ball is held in Brussels on the night before the Battle of Quatre Bras (and three nights before the Battle of Waterloo) by Charlotte, Duchess of Richmond for her son, the writer Lord William Lennox. It subsequently features in literary works by Lord Byron, William Makepeace Thackeray, Charles Lever, Georgette Heyer, Bernard Cornwell and Julian Fellowes.
December 23
Jane Austen's novel Emma is published anonymously by John Murray in London dated 1816. About 1500 copies sell over the next 5 years.
Polish scholar and adventurer Count Jan Potocki, believing that he is becoming a werewolf, shoots himself with a silver bullet, leaving his novel The Manuscript Found in Saragossa incomplete.
Thomas Love Peacock's first novel Headlong Hall is published anonymously by Thomas Hookham in London, dated 1816.
First complete publication of the Old English epic poem Beowulf, in a Latin translation by Icelandic-Danish scholar Grímur Jónsson Thorkelin.
The second volume of the first edition of the Brothers Grimm's Grimms' Fairy Tales is dated this year but published late in 1814.

New books

Fiction
Jane Austen (anonymously) – Emma (dated 1816)
Sarah Green – The Fugitive
Elizabeth Gunning
The Man of Fashion: a Tale of Modern Times
The Victims of Seduction
Ann Hatton ("Ann of Swansea") – Secret Avengers
Mary Hays – The Brothers, or Consequences
E. T. A. Hoffmann – The Devil's Elixirs (Die Elixiere des Teufels)
Barbara Hofland – A Father as He Should Be
Christian Isobel Johnstone (anonymously) – Clan-Albin: A National Tale
Elizabeth Meeke ("Mrs Meeke") – Spanish Campaigns, or The Jew
Thomas Love Peacock – Headlong Hall
Mary Pilkington
Celebrity
The Unfortunate Choice
Jane Porter – The Pastor's Fireside
Regina Marie Roche – Edinburg; a Novel
Walter Scott (anonymously) – Guy Mannering
Catharina Smith – Barozzi or the Venetian Sorceress: A Romance of the Sixteenth Century
Elizabeth Thomas ("Mrs Bridget Bluemantle" – identification unconfirmed) – The Baron of Falconberg, or Childe Harolde in prose

Children and young people
Arabella Argus – The Adventures of a Donkey

Drama
Barbarina Brand – Ina, a tragedy in five acts
Bernhard Severin Ingemann – Blanca
James Sheridan Knowles – Caius Gracchus
Jane Scott – The Gipsy Girl
Eugène Scribe and Delestre Poirson – Une Nuit de la Garde nationale

Poetry
Pierre-Jean de Béranger – Chansons I
Lord Byron – Hebrew Melodies
Walter Scott – The Field of Waterloo
Percy Bysshe Shelley – Alastor, or The Spirit of Solitude
William Wordsworth – The White Doe of Rylstone

Non-fiction
Simón Bolívar – Letter to Jamaica (September 6)
George Cavendish – The Life and Death of Cardinal Wolsey
Alexander von Humboldt – Personal Narrative of Travels to the Equinoctial Regions of the New Continent during the Years 1799–1804 (first edition in French, seven volumes up to 1826)
Les Jeux des Jeunes Garçons
John Malcolm – The History of Persia, from the Most Early Period to the Present Time
Thomas Malthus – An Inquiry into the Nature and Progress of Rent

Births
January 7 – E. Louisa Mather, American writer (died 1882)
February 19 – Elizabeth Missing Sewell, English novelist and educationist (died 1906)
April 24 – Anthony Trollope, English novelist (died 1882)
April 25 – Richard William Church, English biographer and cleric (died 1890)
May 5 – Eugène Marin Labiche, French dramatist (died 1888)
July 17 – Thekla Knös, Swedish poet (died 1880)
August 1 – Marițica Bibescu, Wallachian poet and literary patron (died 1859) 
October 4 – Franz Jakob Clemens, German philosopher (died 1862)
November 5 – Martins Pena, Brazilian dramatist (died 1848)
November 17 – Eliza Farnham, American novelist and reformer (died 1864)
December 10 – Augusta Ada King (née Byron), Countess of Lovelace, English mathematician and writer on computing (died 1852)
December 20 – James Legge, Scottish sinologist, missionary and translator (died 1897)
unknown date – Meenakshi Sundaram Pillai, Tamil scholar and poet (died 1876)

Deaths
January 21 – Matthias Claudius (Asmus), German poet (born 1740)
January 30 – Hans Christian Amberg, Danish lexicographer (born 1749)
March 4 – Frances Abington, née Barton, English actress (born 1737)
April 13 – Thomas Bayly Howell, English legal writer (born 1767)
November 2 – Gottlieb Christoph Harless, German bibliographer (born 1738)
November 11 – Pierre-Louis Ginguené, French writer and critic (born 1748)
November 17 – Dorothea Viehmann, German fairy-story teller (born 1755)
December 20 – Giovanni Meli, Sicilian poet (born 1740)
December 23 – Jan Potocki, Polish polymath (born 1761)

References

 
Years of the 19th century in literature